In numerical linear algebra, the Jacobi method (a.k.a. the Jacobi iteration method) is an iterative algorithm for determining the solutions of a strictly diagonally dominant system of linear equations. Each diagonal element is solved for, and an approximate value is plugged in. The process is then iterated until it converges. This algorithm is a stripped-down version of the Jacobi transformation method of matrix diagonalization. The method is named after Carl Gustav Jacob Jacobi.

Description 
Let  be a square system of n linear equations, where:

Matrix-based formula 

Then A can be decomposed into a diagonal component D, a lower triangular part L and an upper triangular part U:The solution is then obtained iteratively via

Element-based formula 

The element-based formula for each row  is thus:The computation of  requires each element in  except itself. The minimum amount of storage is two vectors of size n.

Algorithm 
 Input: , (diagonal dominant) matrix A, right-hand side vector b, convergence criterion
 Output: 
 Comments: pseudocode based on the element-based formula above
 
 
 while convergence not reached do
     for i := 1 step until n do
         
         for j := 1 step until n do
             if j ≠ i then
                 
             end
         end
         
     end
     increment k
 end

Convergence

The standard convergence condition (for any iterative method) is when the spectral radius of the iteration matrix is less than 1:

A sufficient (but not necessary) condition for the method to converge is that the matrix A is strictly or irreducibly diagonally dominant. Strict row diagonal dominance means that for each row, the absolute value of the diagonal term is greater than the sum of absolute values of other terms:

The Jacobi method sometimes converges even if these conditions are not satisfied.

Note that the Jacobi method does not converge for every symmetric positive-definite matrix. For example,

Examples

Example 1 
A linear system of the form  with initial estimate  is given by

We use the equation , described above, to estimate . From the known values

we determine  as

Further,  is found as

With  and  calculated, we estimate  as :

The next iteration yields

This process is repeated until convergence (i.e., until  is small).  The solution after 25 iterations is

Example 2

Suppose we are given the following linear system:

If we choose  as the initial approximation, then the first approximate solution is given by

Using the approximations obtained, the iterative procedure is repeated until the desired accuracy has been reached. The following are the approximated solutions after five iterations.

Python example 
import numpy as np

ITERATION_LIMIT = 1000

# initialize the matrix
A = np.array([[10., -1., 2., 0.],
              [-1., 11., -1., 3.],
              [2., -1., 10., -1.],
              [0.0, 3., -1., 8.]])
# initialize the RHS vector
b = np.array([6., 25., -11., 15.])

# prints the system
print("System:")
for i in range(A.shape[0]):
    row = ["{}*x{}".format(A[i, j], j + 1) for j in range(A.shape[1])]
    print(f'{" + ".join(row)} = {b[i]}')
print()

x = np.zeros_like(b)
for it_count in range(ITERATION_LIMIT):
    if it_count != 0:
        print("Iteration {0}: {1}".format(it_count, x))
    x_new = np.zeros_like(x)

    for i in range(A.shape[0]):
        s1 = np.dot(A[i, :i], x[:i])
        s2 = np.dot(A[i, i + 1:], x[i + 1:])
        x_new[i] = (b[i] - s1 - s2) / A[i, i]
        if x_new[i] == x_new[i-1]:
          break

    if np.allclose(x, x_new, atol=1e-10, rtol=0.):
        break

    x = x_new

print("Solution: ")
print(x)
error = np.dot(A, x) - b
print("Error:")
print(error)

Weighted Jacobi method 

The weighted Jacobi iteration uses a parameter  to compute the iteration as

with  being the usual choice.
From the relation , this may also be expressed as
.

Convergence in the symmetric positive definite case 

In case that the system matrix  is of symmetric positive-definite type one can show convergence.

Let  be the iteration matrix.
Then, convergence is guaranteed for
 
where  is the maximal eigenvalue.

where  is the matrix condition number.

See also

Gauss–Seidel method
Successive over-relaxation
Iterative method § Linear systems
Gaussian Belief Propagation
Matrix splitting

References

External links
 
 
 Jacobi Method from www.math-linux.com

Numerical linear algebra
Articles with example pseudocode
Relaxation (iterative methods)
Articles with example Python (programming language) code